The canton of Bohain-en-Vermandois is an administrative division in northern France. At the French canton reorganisation which came into effect in March 2015, the canton was expanded from 13 to 31 communes:
 
Aubencheul-aux-Bois
Beaurevoir
Becquigny
Bellenglise
Bellicourt
Bohain-en-Vermandois
Bony
Brancourt-le-Grand
Le Catelet
Croix-Fonsomme
Estrées
Étaves-et-Bocquiaux
Fontaine-Uterte
Fresnoy-le-Grand
Gouy
Hargicourt
Lehaucourt
Joncourt
Lempire
Levergies
Magny-la-Fosse
Montbrehain
Montigny-en-Arrouaise
Nauroy
Prémont
Ramicourt
Seboncourt
Sequehart
Serain  
Vendhuile
Villeret

Demographics

See also
Cantons of the Aisne department 
Communes of France

References

Cantons of Aisne